Šarbov is a village and municipality in Svidník District in the Prešov Region of north-eastern Slovakia.

History
In historical records the village was first mentioned in 1618.

Geography
It has a population of about 10 people.

References

External links
 

Villages and municipalities in Svidník District
Šariš